The Cappahayden Formation is a formation cropping out in Newfoundland.  It comprises fine grey sandstones/siltstones with very fine black parallel laminations, rarely with crossbedding.

References

Ediacaran Newfoundland and Labrador